Vilandai is a village in Kallakurichi district, Tamil Nadu, India. It is situated 8 km away from Thirukovilur. It is in SH 9 of Thirukovilur to Thiruvannamalai road via Manalurpettai. It is 190 km away from the state capital, Chennai.

The local economy is based on  agriculture.  Water is supplied by Sathanur Dam.

The South Pennaru River passes through Villandai. It has one Government High School and Panchayath School.

It comes under the Thirukovilur constituency for state elections and Villupuram constituency for lok sabha elections. In 2017 it had a population of more than 5000.

Vilandai Government High School
Vilandai Government High School teaches students from 6th standard till 12th standard.  The students are instructed in Tamil language as a standard medium of communication.  As of 2017, there are approximately 550 students. About 60% of the students are girls.  The school provides basic lunch for its students, though most kids bring supplemental food.

References

Villages in Kallakurichi district